The blue-tailed finesnout ctenotus (Ctenotus calurus)  is a species of skink found in Northern Territory, South Australia, and Western Australia.

References

calurus
Reptiles described in 1969
Taxa named by Glen Milton Storr